PS Ruby is the name of several ships:

 , the first iron built paddle steamer in service from the English mainland to the Isle of Wight, see Red Funnel
 , a fast Clyde passenger steamer, later a Civil War blockade runner
 , a historic paddle steamer preserved at Wentworth on the Murray River in Australia

References

Ship names